A Very Boy Band Holiday is an American television special, which aired on ABC on December 6, 2021. The program featured musical performances of holiday songs by people from the boy band groups: NSYNC (Joey Fatone, Chris Kirkpatrick, Lance Bass), Boyz II Men (Wanya Morris, Shawn Stockman), New Edition (Bobby Brown, Michael Bivins), New Kids on the Block (Joey McIntyre), O-Town (Erik-Michael Estrada) and 98 Degrees (Nick Lachey, Drew Lachey, Jeff Timmons, Justin Jeffre).

Performances

Appearances

Melanie C

References

External links

2021 television specials
American Broadcasting Company television specials
Christmas television specials